The Las Vegas Thunder were a professional ice hockey team competing in the International Hockey League. The team's home rink was at the Thomas & Mack Center. They began play in the 1993–1994 season, folding on April 18, 1999. The demise of the franchise was precipitated by the refusal of UNLV officials to negotiate with team owners regarding a new agreement to continue playing at the Thomas & Mack Center after the 1998–1999 season. Without a facility that was suitable even for temporary use, the Thunder were forced to shut down.

History
The Thunder made a strong showing in their first season, finishing with the best record in the league: 115 points and a 52–18–11 record. They topped that performance in 1995–1996 when they again finished with the league's best record (122 points, 57–17–8). The Thunder lost in the conference finals that season.

Throughout the team's history they garnered player development deals with the Phoenix Coyotes of the NHL, the ECHL's Knoxville Cherokees and Mississippi Sea Wolves and Russian side Lokomotiv Yaroslavl.

The Thunder's main rivals included the Denver/Utah Grizzlies, Los Angeles/Long Beach Ice Dogs, San Diego Gulls, and Phoenix Roadrunners. These rivalries later saw a rebirth in the ECHL with the Las Vegas Wranglers.

The team's mascot was "Boom-Boom", a polar bear.

The franchise was replaced by:
Las Vegas Wranglers of the ECHL (2003–2015)
Vegas Golden Knights of the NHL (2017–present)

The Golden Knights later acknowledged their Thunder predecessors by basing their 2020–21 Reverse Retro jerseys off of the Thunder's "V-stripe" pattern.

Notable alumni
  Brent Ashton
  Radek Bonk
  Ilya Byakin
  Pavol Demitra
  /  Paul DiPietro
  Bryan Fogarty
  Brent Gretzky
  Glen Gulutzan
 Alex Hicks
  Greg Hawgood
  Peter Ing
  Curtis Joseph
  /  Andre Sioui
  Jim Kyte
  /  Patrice Lefebvre
  Clint Malarchuk
  Wes McCauley
  /  Petr Nedved
  Michel Petit
 Manon Rhéaume
  Pokey Reddick
  Ruslan Salei
  Alexei Yashin
  Sergei Zholtok

Season-by-season record
Note: GP = Games played, W = Wins, L = Losses, T = Ties, OTL = Overtime losses, Pts = Points, GF = Goals for, GA = Goals against, PIM = Penalties in minutes
{| class="wikitable"
|bgcolor="#D0E7FF"|<small>Turner Cup Champions</small>
|bgcolor="#FFCCCC"|Huber Trophy Champions
|bgcolor="#ddffdd"|Division Champions
|}

Head coaches
  Butch Goring 1993–94
  Chris McSorley 1995–98
  Clint Malarchuk 1998–99

HonorsDivision titles : 2 – 1994, 1996Turner Cups : 0Regular Season Titles''' : 2 – 1994, 1996

External links
The Internet Hockey Database - Las Vegas Thunder

International Hockey League (1945–2001) teams
Sports teams in Las Vegas
Ice hockey teams in Nevada
Defunct ice hockey teams in the United States
Ice hockey clubs established in 1993
Sports clubs disestablished in 1999
1993 establishments in Nevada
1999 disestablishments in Nevada
Arizona Coyotes minor league affiliates